Keith Alexander Hessler (born March 15, 1989) is an American former professional baseball pitcher. He previously played in Major League Baseball (MLB) for the Arizona Diamondbacks and San Diego Padres.

Career

Arizona Diamondbacks
Hessler played college baseball at Coastal Carolina University. He was drafted by the Arizona Diamondbacks in the 28th round of the 2010 Major League Baseball Draft. Hessler was called up to the majors for the first time on August 8, 2015.

San Diego Padres
Hessler was claimed off waivers by the San Diego Padres on May 10, 2016. After 15 games of relief in 2016, he was designated for assignment on April 1, 2017, and released on August 3, 2017.

Somerset Patriots
On August 11, 2017, Hessler signed with the Somerset Patriots of the Atlantic League of Professional Baseball.

Colorado Rockies
On January 9, 2018, Hessler signed a minor league contract with the Colorado Rockies. He elected free agency on November 3, 2018.

References

External links

Coastal Carolina Chanticleers bio

1989 births
Living people
People from Silver Spring, Maryland
Baseball players from Maryland
Major League Baseball pitchers
Arizona Diamondbacks players
San Diego Padres players
Coastal Carolina Chanticleers baseball players
Missoula Osprey players
South Bend Silver Hawks players
Visalia Rawhide players
Reno Aces players
Mobile BayBears players
El Paso Chihuahuas players
Gigantes del Cibao players
Somerset Patriots players
Tigres del Licey players
American expatriate baseball players in the Dominican Republic
Albuquerque Isotopes players